The members of the Kurdistan Region Parliament for Fourth Term were elected on 21 September 2013.

Members of the Kurdistan Region Parliament

Seats reserved for Turkmen

Assyrian minority reserved seats

Armenian minority reserved seat

References

External links
Official Kurdistan Parliament website
Official Full results

2013 elections in Iraq
2013 in Iraqi Kurdistan
Members of the Kurdistan Region Parliament